The 1952 United States presidential election in Arkansas took place on November 4, 1952, as part of the 1952 United States presidential election. State voters chose eight representatives, or electors, to the Electoral College, who voted for president and vice president.

Arkansas was won by Adlai Stevenson (D–Illinois), running with Senator John Sparkman, with 55.90% of the popular vote, against Columbia University President Dwight D. Eisenhower (R–New York), running with Senator Richard Nixon, with 43.76% of the popular vote.

Results

Results by county

See also
 United States presidential elections in Arkansas

References

Arkansas
1952
1952 Arkansas elections